Rodolfo Dávila (10 May 1929 – 31 October 2002) was a Mexican wrestler. He competed in the men's freestyle flyweight at the 1952 Summer Olympics.

References

External links
 

1929 births
2002 deaths
Mexican male sport wrestlers
Olympic wrestlers of Mexico
Wrestlers at the 1952 Summer Olympics
Sportspeople from Saltillo
Wrestlers at the 1951 Pan American Games
Pan American Games bronze medalists for Mexico
Pan American Games medalists in wrestling
Medalists at the 1951 Pan American Games
20th-century Mexican people
21st-century Mexican people